Founded in 1996, ConMéxico (Consejo Mexicano de la Industria de Productos de Consumo A.C.) is a group formed by the biggest companies in Mexico, such as Grupo Alpura, Coca-Cola, Grupo FEMSA, Gruma Grupo Bimbo, Philip Morris, Grupo Modelo, PepsiCo, Nestlé, and Unilever.

As it states in its homepage:

ConMéxico proposes to foster a better relation with providers, clients and authorities to strength the industry.
It was formed to solve common problems of their partners.

Members
The members that form ConMéxico are:

Alegro Internacional (Sonrics)
Bacardí y Compañía, S.A. de C.V.
Barcel, S.A. de C.V.
Bimbo, S.A. de C.V.
British American Tobacco México, S.A. de C.V.
Brown-Forman Tequila México, S. de R.L. de C.V.
Cadbury Adams México, S. de R.L. de C.V.
Cadbury Schweppes, S. de R.L. de C.V.
Campbell's de México, S.A. de C.V.
Canel's, S.A. de C.V.
Casa Cuervo, S.A. de C.V.
Cervecería Cuauhtémoc Moctezuma, S.A. de C.V.
Clorox de México
Coca-Cola de México
Colgate-Palmolive, S.A. de C.V.
Compañía Procter & Gamble de México, S. de R.L. de C.V.
Conagra Foods México, S.A. de C.V.
Conservas La Costeña, S.A. de C.V.
Corfuerte, S.A. de C.V.
Gillette de México, S.A. de C.V.
Grupo Alpura, S.A. de C.V.
Grupo Bafar, S.A. de C.V.
Grupo Danone de México, S.A. de C.V.
Grupo Gamesa, S. de R.L. de C.V.
Grupo Industrial Lala, S.A. de C.V.
Grupo Jumex, S.A. de C.V.
Grupo Maseca, S.A. de C.V.
Grupo Modelo, S.A. de C.V.
Herdez, S.A. de C.V.
Industrias AlEn, S.A. de C.V.
Industrias Vinícolas Pedro Domecq, S.A. de C.V.
Jugos del Valle
Kellogg de México, S. de R.L. de C.V.
Masterfoods México
Nestlé México, S.A. de C.V.
PepsiCo de México, S.A. de C.V.
Philip Morris México, S.A. de C.V.
Productos Gerber, S.A. de C.V.
Productos Kraft, S. de R.L. de C.V.
Productos Gatorade de México, S. de R.L. de C.V.
S.C. Johnson and Son, S.A. de C.V.
Sabritas, S. de R.L. de C.V.
Sara Lee Branded Apparel México
Sigma Alimentos Corporativo, S.A. de C.V.
Unilever de México, S.A. de C.V.
Wrigley México, S. de R.L. de C.V.

Criticism

It has already entered into two issues, the first one being that it stood against COFEPRIS, that pressured tobacco and alcoholic companies into paying an amount that would be destined to the Secretaría de Salud (Health Bureau) to prevent and treat diseases provoked by tobacco or alcohol.

ConMéxico also opposed the creation of Sinergia.
In 2001, three retail companies, Gigante, Soriana and Commercial Mexicana tried to form an association (Sinergia) trying to have a bigger buy volume (to get a lower price) and in that way compete with Wal-Mart.

But the CFC (Comisión Federal de Competencia, Federal Competition Commission) voted against the Sinergia group, because "it was a monopolic practice".  Sinergia argued that it wasn't going to have  fixed prices, just wanted to unite to create a bigger sales volume.

What is argued here is that the industries that conform ConMéxico are semi-monopolist, and that's what they were accusing Sinergia of.

Taken from La Jornada newspaper:

"A report by ACNielsen, reveals that, for example, transnational Uniliever holds 40 per cent of the deodorant market, or 75% of consommes and 81 per cent of margarines. Another case: Procter and Gamble has 50 per cent of the detergent sales in supermarkets and 31 per cent in shampoos. Kimberly has 56 per cent of the diaper market and 47.7 per cent of the higienic paper. Nestlé, holds 81 per cent of the soluble coffee market, and 91.8 per cent of powder milk."

Sources
Spanish http://www.conmexico.com.mx/
Spanish https://web.archive.org/web/20050218225450/http://www.radioformula.com.mx/rf2001.asp?ID2=22022
Spanish http://www.cidac.org/portalesp/modules.php?name=News&file=article&sid=2630
Spanish https://web.archive.org/web/20050218230905/http://www.radioformula.com.mx/rf2001.asp?ID2=22445
Spanish http://www.jornada.unam.mx/2004/07/08/022n1eco.php?origen=index.html&fly=1

External links

Business organizations based in Mexico